Salli Saffioti (born June 11, 1976) is an American actress. She is known for voicing roles in video games including Ingrid Hunnigan in Resident Evil 4, Resident Evil: Degeneration, Resident Evil: Damnation and Resident Evil 6, Ming in Lost Odyssey, the Sea Captain's daughter in Tales of the Black Freighter, Razia in Prince of Persia: The Forgotten Sands and the Black Widow in Spider-Man: Web of Shadows. First Arcanist Thalyssra in World of Warcraft: Legion. Voices the Female Hero in Fable II and III. In the Monster High franchise, she voices main characters Clawdeen Wolf and Cleo de Nile, which in later video installments she goes under the stage name Celeste Henderson. She also goes under this name for non-union productions.

Filmography

Live action

Animation

Video games

References

External links
 
 

Living people
American film actresses
American television actresses
American video game actresses
American voice actresses
American web series actresses
21st-century American actresses
Place of birth missing (living people)
1976 births